Nnamdi Azikiwe Stadium is a multi-purpose stadium in Enugu, Nigeria.  It is currently used mostly for football matches and is the home stadium of Enugu Rangers.  The stadium has a capacity of 22,000   and it was named after the first president of the Republic of Nigeria, Nnamdi Azikiwe.

History
Nnamdi Azikiwe Stadium used to belong to the Nigerian Railway Corporation (NRC). Until then it was the most flamboyant playing facility in Enugu.

As far back as 1959, the facility was the sports ground of the corporation, the Eastern District. This is not surprising as the corporation was in the forefront of the promotion of sports during and even after the colonial era. As time went on, apparently because of its strategic location right at the heart of Enugu, the defunct Eastern Nigeria Government took over the management of the venue and raised its profile.

The stadium continued to serve as the rallying point for sportsmen and women residents in the eastern region, until the outbreak of the Nigeria/Biafra civil war. It was refurbished after the civil war with hostel facilities to accommodate athletes. It also housed the state's sports council.

Rangers International of Enugu were also founded at the time and made the stadium their home base. The image of Rangers loomed large in the 1970s, particularly because of the impressive results they posted shortly after forming.

There was, thereafter, clamour to rebuild the facility. This led to teamed efforts by the then old Anambra State Government in partnership with the private sector to raise funds for the rebuilding of the stadium, which was inaugurated in 1986.

Thirteen years after, the stadium was refurbished again to pave way for the staging of the FIFA U-20 World Cup Nigeria 1999. It staged important matches including Nigeria's loss to Mali in the quarter-finals.

The stadium, which previously had natural grass, now has an artificial turf and a new videomatrix scoreboard. These, and other refurbishing works, were designed to give the stadium a more modern and technologically driven edifice because it was one of the hosting stadiums of FIFA U-17 World Cup Nigeria 2009..

It hosted matches in Group D, which comprised Turkey, Costa Rica, Burkina Faso and New Zealand at the FIFA U-17 World Cup Nigeria 2009.

Notable football tournaments

1999 FIFA World Youth Championship

2009 FIFA U-17 World Cup

References 

Multi-purpose stadiums in Nigeria
Enugu
Buildings and structures in Enugu State
Football venues in Nigeria
Rangers International F.C.